Matheus Borges Domingues (born 22 January 1992) is a Brazilian professional footballer who plays as a centre back or left back.

Club career
Matheus started his career with Londrina EC.

References

1992 births
Living people
Brazilian footballers
Association football defenders
Londrina Esporte Clube players
Royal Antwerp F.C. players
Campeonato Paranaense players
Campeonato Brasileiro Série C players
Campeonato Brasileiro Série B players
Belgian Pro League players
Brazilian expatriate footballers
Expatriate footballers in Belgium
Brazilian expatriate sportspeople in Belgium